Irina Vladimirovna Kirillova (born 15 May 1965), also known as Irina Parkhomchuk, is a retired competitive volleyball  player and Olympic gold medalist for the Soviet Union, later competing for Croatia.

In the 1990s, Kirilova played for the Croatia women's national volleyball team.

At the 2006 FIVB Volleyball Women's World Championship, she was the assistant coach to the Russia women's national volleyball team. In 2011, Kirilova became the coach of the Croatian national team, but resigned the position the same year.

In 2017 Kirillova was inducted into the Volleyball Hall of Fame.

As of 2017, Kirillova is living in Italy. She is married to Giovanni Caprara, an Italian volleyball coach.

Clubs
  Uralochka Sverdlovsk (1980–1990)
 / Mladost Zagreb (1990–1994)
  Pallavolo Sumirago (1994–1996)
  Volley Modena (1996–1997)
  Mappin/Pinheiros (1997–1998)
  Foppapedretti Bergamo (1998–1999)
  Virtus Reggio Calabria (1999–2001)
  Pallavolo Sirio Perugia (2001–2004)
  Chieri Volley (2005–2006)
  Dinamo Moscow (2008–2009)
  Asystel Volley (2009–2010)
  Uralochka-NTMK (2012–2012)

References

External links
 Irina Kirillova at LegaVolleyFemminile.it 
 
 
 

Soviet women's volleyball players
Olympic volleyball players of the Soviet Union
Volleyball players at the 1988 Summer Olympics
Olympic gold medalists for the Soviet Union
1965 births
Sportspeople from Tula, Russia
Living people
Olympic medalists in volleyball
Croatian women's volleyball players
Croatian people of Russian descent
Medalists at the 1988 Summer Olympics
Competitors at the 1986 Goodwill Games
Competitors at the 1990 Goodwill Games
Goodwill Games medalists in volleyball
Mediterranean Games gold medalists for Croatia
Mediterranean Games medalists in volleyball
Competitors at the 1993 Mediterranean Games
Naturalized citizens of Croatia